Željeznički prevoz Crne Gore (ŽPCG) (Cyrillic: Жељезнички превоз Црне Горе; English: Railway transport of Montenegro) is a joint-stock company that handles passenger transport within Montenegro, as well as operation of the Montenegrin rolling stock.

Rolling stock 
Rolling stock of Railway transport of Montenegro consists of 39 locomotives and 5 EMUs:

Locomotives

Diesel locomotives
 4 locomotives of JŽ series 644
 4 locomotives of JŽ series 642 (2 active)
 2 locomotives of JŽ series 643
 6 locomotives of JŽ series 744 (none of them is active)

Multiple units

Passenger cars
Railway transport of Montenegro also has following inventory of passenger cars:

 31 passenger coaches (classes A, AB and B)
 1 buffet car (class WR)
 32 sleeping and couchette cars (classes AcBc, Ac, Bc and WLAB)
 10 car-carrier wagons (class DDam)

Freight cars
Freight cars in inventory are as follows:

 226 wagons (class G)
 15 wagons (class K)
 62 wagons (class R)
 7 wagons (class S)
 415 wagons (class E)
 29 wagons (class F)
 34 wagons (class Z)
 33 wagons (class U)
 3 wagons (class H)

See also
Transport in Montenegro
Rail transport in Montenegro

References

Rail transport in Montenegro
2008 establishments in Montenegro
Railway companies established in 2008